"Save Me" is a single by American rock band Hinder from their album Welcome to the Freakshow. It was released on August 30, 2012, by Republic Records. The song debuted on the Active Rock Chart at number 23.

Charts

References

Hinder songs
2012 songs
Songs written by the Warren Brothers
Songs written by Cody Hanson
Songs written by Austin John Winkler
Republic Records singles